Andres Toobal (born 27 August 1988) is an Estonian volleyball coach. He is the head coach of Selver Tallinn of the Estonian Volleyball League and also serves as the assistant coach of the Estonia women's national volleyball team.

Estonian national team
As a member of the senior Estonia men's national volleyball team, Toobal competed at the 2015 and 2017 Men's European Volleyball Championship. With the national team Toobal won the 2016 European Volleyball League title.

Sporting achievements

Clubs
Baltic League
  2009/2010 - with Pere Leib Tartu
  2011/2012 - with Pärnu
  2013/2014 - with Bigbank Tartu
  2014/2015 - with Selver Tallinn

National championship
 2006/2007  Estonian Championship, with Pärnu
 2007/2008  Estonian Championship, with Pärnu
 2008/2009  Estonian Championship, with Pärnu
 2009/2010  Estonian Championship, with Pere Leib Tartu
 2010/2011  Estonian Championship, with Pere Leib Tartu
 2011/2012  Estonian Championship, with Pärnu
 2013/2014  Estonian Championship, with Bigbank Tartu
 2015/2016  Estonian Championship, with Selver Tallinn
 2017/2018  Slovak Championship, with Prievidza

National cup
 2013/2014  Estonian Cup 2013, with Bigbank Tartu
 2017/2018  Slovak Cup 2018, with Prievidza

National team
 2016  European League

Individual
 2007 Young Estonian Volleyball Player of the Year
 2018 Slovak Cup – Most Valuable Player

Personal life
Andres Toobal is the younger brother of Estonia men's national volleyball team captain Kert Toobal.

References

1988 births
Living people
Estonian men's volleyball players
Estonian expatriate sportspeople in Belgium
Estonian expatriate sportspeople in France
Expatriate volleyball players in Belgium
Expatriate volleyball players in France
Estonian expatriate volleyball players
People from Türi
Estonian expatriate sportspeople in Slovakia
Expatriate volleyball players in Slovakia
Estonian volleyball coaches
Volleyball coaches of international teams